Chakia (sometimes written as Chakiya) is a small town (nagar panchayat) and the sub-divisional headquarters of Chakia Tehsil in the District of Chandauli of Varanasi Division in the northern Indian state of Uttar Pradesh.

Geography

The Chandra Prabha Wildlife Sanctuary, famous for its flora and fauna in the hills of Vindhyas, is a stone throw-away from the town of Chakia.

The tehsil consists of forests, dams, rivers and hills most of which form the Chandra Prabha Sanctuary. Karamnasa, Chandraprabha and Garai rivers drain the tehsil.

History

In British India Chakia was part of the Benares State and was one of the tehsils of Varanasi district until 1997. The tehsil stretches from Gangetic plains to the center of Vindhyas plateau. A good part of the tehsil lies on the Vindhya plateau.

Economy 

The economy of the region is largely agricultural.

Demographics
 India census, the Chakia Nagar Panchayat had a population of 17,356, of which 9,050 were males, and 8,306 were females.

Population of children aged 0–6 years was 2,440 which translated into 14.06% of total population of the Nagar Panchayat. Sex ratio was 918 females per 1,000 males against state average of 912 females per 1,000 males. Moreover, child sex ratio in Chakia was around 883:1,000 compared to Uttar Pradesh's average of 902:1,000.  Chakia's literacy rate was 75.90%, which was higher than state average of 67.68%. In Chakia, male literacy rate was around 81.43% compared to female's 69.91%.

Sights
 Chandra Prabha Wildlife Sanctuary— The sanctuary is famous for its wildlife and two waterfalls, Raj Dari and Dev Dari, and a reservoir.
 Latif-Shah Dam— This dam is considered one of the oldest dams in India, Which was completed in 1921; it is built on the river Karm-nasha. The reservoir created by the dam is used mainly for irrigation.
 Kali Temple— The temple devoted to goddess Kali was built by the King of Banaras State in the 16th century. The temple campus includes a large pond.
 Maharaja Quila— A small fort built by Raja Balwant Singh of Benares to rest during hunting trips.
 Mushakhad Dam— Another dam on Karm-nasha. The reservoir created by this dam is used mainly for irrigation. 
 Jageshwarnath Temple— The temple is devoted to Lord Shiva, situated on the banks of river Chandra-Prabha, a short distance from the town.

Transportation
No regular mass-transit to and from Chakia is available these days. Government-run bus service of past is infrequently available. The nearest railway station, Pandit Deendayal Upadhyay, is approximately 30 kilometres away.
The nearest airport, the Lal Bahadur Shastri International, named after the second prime minister of India, is nearly 60 kilometers northwest from Chakia.

References

Cities and towns in Chandauli district